Acacia verticillata (prickly Moses; prickly-leaved wattle; star-leaved acacia; prickly mimosa; whorl-leaved acacia) is a perennial shrub to small tree native to south eastern Australia.

Description
Like most species of Acacia it has phyllodes rather than true leaves. The phyllodes are glabrous, pungent and rigid with one main visible vein. The compressed a linear seed pods that form after flowering are barely constricted between each of the seeds.

Taxonomy
The species was first described by Charles Louis L'Héritier de Brutelle in 1806 as part of Carl Ludwig Willdenows work Species Plantarum. It was reclassified as Racosperma verticillatum by Leslie Pedley in 2003 then transferred back to genus Acacia in 2006.

Four subspecies are known:
 Acacia verticillata subsp. verticillata
 Acacia verticillata subsp. ruscifolia
 Acacia verticillata subsp. cephalantha
 Acacia verticillata subsp. ovoidea

Distribution
A. verticillata is endemic to New South Wales, Victoria, South Australia and Tasmania. The species is a common understorey shrub in both wet and dry sclerophyll forests as well as scrub and heath. In coastal environments it will often have much wider leaves as opposed to the regular needle-like nature of inland specimens.

Uses
Prickly Moses is sold commercially for cultivation and can grow in full sun or part shade in a variety of locations including plains, hills and footslopes as a second line from the coast. It will grow in clay or loam soils that are alkaline, neutral or acidic and will tolerate drought, water logging and a moderate frost. It is regarded as an excellent habitat for birds but is highly flammable and not recommended for near houses in bushfire prone areas.
Indigenous Australians used the fibre from the plant to make fishing lines.

In popular culture
On 1 September 2016, the Reserve Bank of Australia released a replacement of the polymer five dollar note which includes a depiction of Acacia verticillata (subspecies ovoidea).

See also
 List of Acacia species

References 

verticillata
Fabales of Australia
Flora of Tasmania
Flora of Victoria (Australia)
Plants described in 1806
Taxa named by Carl Ludwig Willdenow
Taxa named by Charles Louis L'Héritier de Brutelle